Roopa Unnikrishnan is an Indian-born American sports shooter and innovation consultant, based in New York City. In 1998, she was the first Indian woman to ever win a gold medal at the Commonwealth Games, in the 50m rifle prone position event.

Biography
Unnikrishnan won the Arjuna Award, India's highest sporting prize (equivalent to sports hall of fame) presented by India's President in 1999. The award recognized her multiple global medals, including gold medal and record in the XVI Commonwealth Games, Kuala Lumpur, Malaysia, 1998, in women's prone sports rifle; Silver medal at the World Shooting Grand Prix, Ft. Benning, Georgia, 1998; hold several records at the South Asian level.

She has been a strong advocate for increased support for athletes in India, where they continue to be resource constrained.

Though Shooting is a "Half Blue" sport at Oxford, Unnikrishnan was awarded an Extraordinary Full Blue, since she had won the Commonwealth medal, helped the Oxford team win in university leagues, and was the Captain of the Oxford Women's Shooting Team.

In 1995, she won a Rhodes Scholarship from India.

She got her B.A. at Women's Christian College, Chennai; an M.A. at Ethiraj College, Chennai; an M.A. in Economic History at Balliol in Oxford; and an M.B.A from the Said School of Business in Oxford.

She is Head of Strategy at Harman International in New York City. She has contributed to The Economic Times and to Knowledge@Wharton.

In 2017, she published the book, The Career Catapult: Shake-up the Status Quo and Boost Your Professional Trajectory.

Personal life
Unnikrishnan became a US Citizen in 2013.  She is married to Sreenath Sreenivasan, former Chief Digital Officer at the Metropolitan Museum of Art.

See also 
 Indians in the New York City metropolitan area

References 

Year of birth missing (living people)
Living people
Commonwealth Games medallists in shooting
Commonwealth Games gold medallists for India
Commonwealth Games silver medallists for India
Women's Christian College, Chennai alumni
Shooters at the 1994 Commonwealth Games
Shooters at the 1998 Commonwealth Games
Recipients of the Arjuna Award
Medallists at the 1994 Commonwealth Games
Medallists at the 1998 Commonwealth Games